Nora May French (1881 – November 13, 1907) was an American journalist, poet, and member of the bohemian literary circles of the Carmel Arts and Crafts Club which flourished after the Great San Francisco Earthquake and Fire of 1906.

Early life
French was born in 1881 in Aurora, New York to Edward French, a professor at Wells College and Mary Wells French, the sister of the founder of Wells Fargo, Henry Wells. When she was seven years old, her wealthy family moved to a ranch outside of Los Angeles, but within a few years they lost that property as a result of a devastating house fire and a failed fruit crop.

Career
Her writing career began in her teens, when she was published in local newspapers and magazines. In her early twenties, she became engaged, off and on again, to Alan Hiley, a prosperous timber farmer. Her ambivalence about conventional marriage poured into The Spanish Girl, her best known lyrics, a twenty-two poem chronicle of doomed love. After their final break-up, French joined the Charles Lummis Arroyo Seco, a group of Los Angeles writers and poets who encouraged her to publish in Lummis' Out West magazine. Although her work won praise, notably from the feminist and environmentalist poet Mary Austin, recognition did not translate to financial security.

French became involved with Henry Anderson Lafler, an assistant editor on The Argonaut, and moved to San Francisco after the 1906 earthquake. She quickly made her place within bohemian intellectual circles and endured several unhappy affairs.

Death
In 1907 she joined George Sterling and his wife at their home in Carmel, but was unable to overcome her problems. French grew more depressed and on Monday November 11, tried to kill herself unsuccessfully with a gunshot to the head. The bullet took off a lock of her hair, but Nora missed her mark due to her shaky hand. Two days later, during the night of November 13–14, she died in Sterling's home (he was absent in San Francisco) from ingesting cyanide while Mrs. Sterling slept beside her.  Nora was twenty-six years old. Newspapers in the San Francisco Bay Area sensationalized the tragedy with glaring headlines and reports of Bohemian dissipations as well as recent and frequent visits by prominent married men, including the artists Charles Dickman, Xavier Martinez, and Charles Rollo Peters. Funeral services were at Point Lobos with George Sterling, James Hopper, Alan Hiley, and Henry Lafler attending. Her ashes were scattered into the Pacific Ocean.

Legacy

Three of her friends posthumously published French’s Poems in 1910, the only compilation of her work ever widely distributed until the recent (2009) release of Hippocampus Press's The Outer Gate: The Collected Poems Of Nora May French.

Although many of her poems celebrate the serenity of coastal landscape, others are less sanguine: they offer glimpses into the mind of a young woman torn between pressure to submit to social roles and longing to live creatively.  “All sensible people will ultimately be damned,” she said, but lack of stability also plagued her.

References

External links 
 Poems by Nora May French
 2 short radio episodes of Nora May French's "Poems" from California Legacy Project.
 
 
 
 "The Diary of a Telephone Girl", anonymously published article by Nora May French in The Saturday Evening Post (Volume 180, Issue 2, October 19, 1907), at HathiTrust

1881 births
1907 deaths
People from Aurora, Cayuga County, New York
American women poets
20th-century American poets
20th-century American women writers
19th-century American poets
19th-century American women writers
People from Carmel-by-the-Sea, California
1907 suicides